The Roman Catholic Diocese of Ebibeyín (officially, the Diocese "Virgin of Begoña, Mother of Christ" of Ebibeyín) is a diocese in the Ecclesiastical province (covering all Equatorial Guinea) of Malabo, yet depends on the missionary Roman Congregation for the Evangelization of Peoples.

Its cathedral episcopal see is located in the city of Ebibeyin, Kié-Ntem province, Región Continental.

Statistics 
As per 2014, it pastorally served 158,000 Catholics (69.0% of 229,140 total) on 3,943 km2 in 11 parishes with 25 priests (19 diocesan, 6 religious), 40 lay religious (12 brothers, 28 sisters) and 19 seminarians.

Shortly before the 2017 loss of daughter Mongomo, it had an area of 12,000 square miles, a total population of 204,000, a Catholic population of 164,000, 33 priests and 89 religious.

History 
 Established on October 15, 1982 as Diocese of Ebibeyín, on territory split off from the Diocese of Bata.
 Lost territory on 2017.04.01 to establish the Diocese of Mongomo (in the same ecclesiastical province).

Episcopal ordinaries
(all Roman rite)

Suffragan Bishops of Ebibeyín
Apostolic Administrator Father Ildefonso Obama Obono Ildefonso Obama Obono (1982.10.15 – 1991.07.09 see below), previously Apostolic Administrator of Bata (Equatorial Guinea) (1971 – 1975)
 Juan Matogo Oyana, Claretians (C.M.F.) (1991.10.11 – 2002.05.11 see below), next Bishop of Bata (Equatorial Guinea) (2002.05.11 – ...) 
 Alfred Maria Oburu Asue, C.M.F. (2003.03.08 – 2006.08.27)Apostolic Administrator Juan Matogo Oyana, C.M.F. (see above 2006.08.30 – 2011.02.19)
 Juan Nsue Edjang Maye (2011.02.19 - 2015.02.11), born in Mikomeseng (Kie Ntem province) in 1957, ordained a priest in 1995, until then pastor of the parishes of Our Lady of Mount Carmel and Our Lady of Help on the island of Bioko, Equatorial Guinea; next Metropolitan Archbishop of Malabo (Equatorial Guinea) (2015.02.11 – ...)
 Miguel Angel Nguema Bee, Salesians (S.D.B.) (2017.04.01 – ...), no previous prelature.

See also 
 List of Catholic dioceses in Equatorial Guinea
 Roman Catholicism in Equatorial Guinea

References

External links 
 GCatholic.org, with Google map & satellithe photo - data for all sections

Roman Catholic dioceses in Equatorial Guinea
Ebibeyin
Roman Catholic dioceses and prelatures established in the 20th century
1982 establishments in Equatorial Guinea
Ebibeyin